This article is about the demographic features of the population of Eswatini, including population density, ethnicity, education level, health of the populace, economic status, religious affiliations and other aspects of the population.

 
The majority of Eswatini's population is ethnic Swazi, mixed with a small number of Zulus and white Africans, predominantly of British and Afrikaner origin. This population also includes a small segment within it that is mixed with any number of these ancestries.

Traditionally Swazis have been subsistence farmers and herders, but most now work in the growing urban formal economy and in government. Some Swazis work in the mines in South Africa. Eswatini also received Portuguese settlers and black refugees from Mozambique. Christianity in Eswatini is sometimes mixed with traditional beliefs and practices. Most Swazis ascribe a special spiritual role to the Swazi Royal Family.

The country's official languages are Siswati (a language related to Zulu) and English. Government and commercial business is conducted mainly in English. Asians, Afrikaners, Portuguese, and black Mozambicans speak their own languages.

Population

Eswatini's population is 1,113,276 according to the July 2021 estimate from the CIA World Factbook. 
The 2007 Census put the nation's population at 912,229. This number is lower than the 1997 Census, which gave 929,718 residents. The small difference is believed to be the result of massive emigration of Swazis to South Africa in search of work.

According to the 2010 revision of the World Population Prospects the total population was 1,186,000 in 2010, compared to only 273,000 in 1950. The proportion of children below the age of 15 in 2010 was 38.4%, 58.2% was between 15 and 65 years of age, while 3.4% was 65 years or older
.

Population by Sex and Age Group (Census 29.IV.2017):

Vital statistics
Registration of vital events is in Eswatini not complete. The Population Department of the United Nations prepared the following estimates.

Fertility and Births
Total Fertility Rate (TFR) (Wanted Fertility Rate) and Crude Birth Rate (CBR):

Life expectancy at birth 
Life expectancy from 1950 to 2015 (UN World Population Prospects):

Other demographic statistics 

Demographic statistics according to the World Population Review in 2022.

One birth every 18 minutes	
One death every 50 minutes	
One net migrant every 85 minutes	
Net gain of one person every 42 minutes

The following demographic statistics are from the CIA World Factbook.

Population
1,121,761 (2022 est.)
1,087,200 (July 2018 est.)

Religions

Christian 90% (Zionist - a blend of Christianity and indigenous ancestral worship - 40%, Roman Catholic 20%, other 30% - includes Anglican, Methodist, Church of Jesus Christ, Jehovah's Witness), Muslim 2%, other 8% (includes Baha'i, Buddhist, Hindu, indigenous, Jewish) (2015 est.)

Median age
total: 23.7 years. Country comparison to the world: 174th
male: 22.5 years
female: 24.7 years (2020 est.)

total: 23.2 years. Country comparison to the world: 175th
male: 22.2 years 
female: 24 years (2018 est.)
	
total: 21.7 years
male: 21.5 years
female: 21.9 years (2017 est.)

Age structure 

0-14 years: 33.63% (male 185,640/female 185,808)
15-24 years: 18.71% (male 98,029/female 108,654)
25-54 years: 39.46% (male 202,536/female 233,275)
55-64 years: 4.36% (male 20,529/female 27,672)
65 years and over: 3.83% (male 15,833/female 26,503) (2020 est.)

0-14 years: 34.41% (male 186,747 /female 187,412)
15-24 years: 19.31% (male 99,192 /female 110,770)
25-54 years: 38.22% (male 193,145 /female 222,405)
55-64 years: 4.28% (male 19,915 /female 26,663)
65 years and over: 3.77% (male 15,470 /female 25,481) (2018 est.)

0-14 years: 35.01% (male 259,646/female 253,976)
15-24 years: 22.12% (male 164,117/female 160,478)
25-54 years: 34.6% (male 264,262/female 243,362)
55-64 years: 4.3% (male 25,319/female 37,763)
65 years and over: 3.97% (male 22,113/female 36,116) (2017 est.)

Population growth rate
0.75% (2022 est.) Country comparison to the world: 123rd
0.82% (2018 est.) Country comparison to the world: 128th
1.08% (2017 est.)

Birth rate
23.35 births/1,000 population (2022 est.) Country comparison to the world: 49th
25.8 births/1,000 population (2018 est.) Country comparison to the world: 48th
24 births/1,000 population (2017 est.)

Death rate
9.71 deaths/1,000 population (2022 est.) Country comparison to the world: 40th
10.7 deaths/1,000 population (2018 est.)
13.2 deaths/1,000 population (2017 est.)

Total fertility rate
2.44 children born/woman (2022 est.) Country comparison to the world: 71st
2.63 children born/woman (2018 est.) Country comparison to the world: 68th
2.69 children born/woman (2017 est.)

Net migration rate
-6.16 migrant(s)/1,000 population (2022 est.) Country comparison to the world: 210th
0 migrant(s)/1,000 population (2017 est.) Country comparison to the world: 82nd

Contraceptive prevalence rate
66.1% (2014)

Dependency ratios
total dependency ratio: 68.8 (2015 est.)
youth dependency ratio: 63.5 (2015 est.)
elderly dependency ratio: 5.2 (2015 est.)
potential support ratio: 19.1 (2015 est.)

Urbanization
urban population: 24.6% of total population (2022)
rate of urbanization: 2.42% annual rate of change (2020-25 est.)

urban population: 23.8% of total population (2018)
rate of urbanization: 2.46% annual rate of change (2015-20 est.)

Maternal mortality rate
389 deaths/100,000 live births (2015 est.)

Infant mortality rate
total: 48.4 deaths/1,000 live births
male: 52.2 deaths/1,000 live births
female: 44.4 deaths/1,000 live births (2017 est.)

Life expectancy at birth
total population: 59.69 years. Country comparison to the world: 219th
male: 57.62 years
female: 61.81 years (2022 est.)

total population: 57.2 years 
male: 55.1 years 
female: 59.3 years (2018 est.)

male: 52.7 years (2017 est.)
female: 51.5 years (2017 est.)
total population:

49.06 (2012 est.)
47.85 (2010 est.)
33.22 (2005 est.)
39.47 (2003 est.)

Sex ratio
at birth: 1.02 (2017, 2003 est.), 1.03 male(s)/female (2000 est.)
0-14 years: 1.02 (2017 est.), 0.99 male(s)/female (2003, 2000 est.)
15-24 years: 1.08 (2017 est.)
25-54 years: 0.66 male(s)/female (2017 est.)
65 years and over: 0.64 (2017 est.), 0.78 (2003 est.), 0.7 male(s)/female (2000 est.)
total population: 1 (2017 est.), 0.99 (2003 est.), 0.95 male(s)/female (2000 est.)

Education expenditures 
7.1% of GDP (2014)

Health expenditures
9.3% of GDP (2014)

Obesity - adult prevalence rate 
16.5% (2016)

Children under the age of 5 years underweight 
5.8% (2014)

Physicians density
0.15 physicians/1,000 population (2009)

Hospital bed density
2.1 beds/1,000 population (2011)

HIV/AIDS
adult prevalence rate: 27.4% (2017 est.)
people living with HIV/AIDS: 210,000 (2017 est.)
deaths: 3,500 (2017 est.)

Major infectious diseases
degree of risk: intermediate (2020)
food or waterborne diseases: bacterial diarrhea, hepatitis A, and typhoid fever
vectorborne diseases: malaria
water contact diseases: schistosomiasis

Nationality
noun:
Swazi(s)
adjective:
Swazi

Ethnic groups
Swazi 84.3%
Zulu 9.9%
Tsonga 2.5%
Indian 0.8%
Pakistani 0.8%
Portuguese 0.5%

Languages
English (official, used for government business)
siSwati (official)

Literacy
definition: age 15 and over can read and write
total population: 88.4%
male: 88.3%
female: 88.5% (2018)

total population: 87.5% (2015 est.), 81.6% (2003 est.), 76.7% (1995 est.)
male: 87.4% (2015 est.), 82.6% (2003 est.), 78% (1995 est.)
female: 87.5% (2015 est.), 80.8% (2003 est.), 75.6% (1995 est.)

School life expectancy (primary to tertiary education)
total: 13 years
male: 13 years
female: 12 years (2013)

See also 
HIV/AIDS in Swaziland

Notes

 

 
Society of Eswatini

pt:Suazilândia#Demografia